VH1 Brasil was a music channel from Viacom-owned Viacom International Media Networks The Americas. The network was launched in November 2005 on some cable systems, but it was not until May 2006 that it was launched on DirecTV Brazil, replacing MTV Latin America.

It targets 25- to 44-year-olds and plays local and international music videos from the 1970s to the 2000s. It also airs famous "Top 20" and "Top 40" countdowns from VH1 USA. At its launch, VH1's Celebreality shows, such as The Surreal Life, Breaking Bonaduce, My Fair Brady, SuperGroup and So NoTORIous, were not aired on VH1 Brasil, yet they did air on its sister network, VH1 Latin America. However, since September 2006, the network has started running those shows, starting with The Surreal Life.
VH1 Brasil also airs The Graham Norton Show, MTV-produced Next and Comedy Central-produced South Park.

VH1 Brasil replaced VH1 Soul on SKY Brasil, where it was available in the country since 2004, though, in 2013, SKY replaced VH1's standard-definition feed with the relaunched MTV, while retaining VH1 HD. In December 12, 2014, VH1 was also taken off from NET, being replaced with a local version of VH1 MegaHits.  VH1 Brasil was replaced by Paramount Channel on November 14, 2014.

Programming on VH1 Brasil
Original VH1 programming:
I Could Kill For Dessert (original Brazilian series)
Esposas da Máfia (Mob Wives)
Audrina
Sex Rehab with Dr. Drew
Pop Up Video
Os Modelos Mais Inteligentíssimos da América (America's Most Smartest Model)
Flavor of Love: Sabores do Amor (Flavor of Love)
Rock of Love with Bret Michaels
Rock of Love Bus
Escola de Charme: Rock of Love (Rock of Love: Charm School)
I Love New York
New York Goes to Hollywood
I Love Money: Tudo por Dinheiro (I Love Money)
Papai Hogan Sabe Tudo (Hogan Knows Best)
Brooke Sabe Tudo (Brooke Knows Best)
Old Skool with Terry & Gita
A Escola de Rock de Gene Simmons (Gene Simmons' Rock School)
Celebridades Paranormais (Celebrity Paranormal Project)
A Vida Surrealista (The Surreal Life)
Meu Querido Brady (My Fair Brady)
A Glamurosa Vida de... (The Fabulous Life of...)
Behind the Music

Original VH1 specials:
VH1 Divas 2009
VH1 Storytellers

Other Viacom Media Networks programming:
Jennie Garth: De Casa Nova (Jennie Garth: A Little Bit Country, from CMT)
That Metal Show (from VH1 Classic)
Unplugged (MTV Unplugged, from MTV)
Bully Beatdown (from MTV)
Só Quero Minhas Calças (I Just Want My Pants Back, from MTV)
Meninas Malvadas (Niñas Mal, from MTV Latin America)
Popland! (from MTV Latin America)
South Park (from Comedy Central, also seen on MTV. Before airing in VH1 Brasil, it aired in Locomotion before Locomotion's closure and Animax's launch)
She's Got the Look (from TV Land, currently seen on E!)
Next (from MTV)
RuPaul e a Corrida das Loucas (RuPaul's Drag Race, from Logo TV)
Ugly Americans (from Comedy Central)
Beavis and Butt-Head (from MTV)
Ren e Stimpy Só para Adultos (Ren & Stimpy "Adult Party Cartoon", from Spike TV, also seen on Multishow)

Other programming:
1st Look (LX.TV 1st Look)
On The Rocks (LX.TV On The Rocks)
The O.C. (second-run, currently seen on MTV)
The Graham Norton Show
The Real L Word (second-run, first-run on GNT)
Segredos de uma Garota de Programa (Secret Diary of a Call Girl, second-run, first-run on HBO Plus)
Skins: Juventude à Flor da Pele (Skins, UK series, second-run, first-run on HBO Plus)

See also
VH1
MTV Networks Latin America

References

External links
 VH1 Brasil

Music television channels
Defunct television channels in Brazil
Television channels and stations established in 2005
Television channels and stations disestablished in 2014
2005 establishments in Brazil
2014 disestablishments in Brazil
VH1
Music organisations based in Brazil